Lucas Learning was a company founded by George Lucas in 1996 as a spin-off to LucasArts in order to provide challenging, engaging and fun educational software for classrooms. Many of their award-winning titles were based on the national curriculum. The company was located in San Rafael, California, and was headed by former MECC senior vice president of development and creative director Susan Schilling. Shilling asserted that Lucas was personally involved with the products and that a company mantra was to stay away from violence. They released games from 1998 until announcing their cancellation of a Mac version of Star Wars Super Bombad Racing in mid 2001, the year Lucas Learning decided to leave the market.

Games

Critical reception 
The Boston Herald wrote that the company was "setting a new standard in software development with a unique cooperative effort between Lucas' film and software sides".

References

External links 
 Interview with Lucas Learning's Jane Boston about company's philosophy and direction, The Journal

Video game development companies
Defunct video game companies of the United States